The World Series is the championship series of Major League Baseball.  It may also refer to:

Baseball and softball

Professional baseball
 Triple-A World Series, a contest in Minor League Baseball
 Junior World Series, a former championship in Minor League Baseball, played from 1904–1975
 Caribbean World Series
 Negro World Series, a post-season baseball tournament which was held from 1924–1927 and from 1942–1948 between the champions of the Negro leagues, matching the mid-western winners against their east coast counterparts

Amateur baseball and softball
 College World Series, an annual baseball tournament held in Omaha, Nebraska that is the culmination of the NCAA Division I Baseball Championship, which determines the NCAA Division I college baseball champion
 Women's College World Series, the final portion of the NCAA Division I Softball Championship for college softball in the United States
 Pony League World Series, a baseball tournament for children aged 14 and under
 Little League World Series, a baseball tournament for children aged 11 to 12 years old
 Little League Softball World Series
 Intermediate League World Series
 Junior League World Series
 Junior League World Series (softball), a softball tournament for girls aged between 13 and 14
 Senior League World Series
 Big League World Series

Baseball video games
 World Series Baseball (video game) for the Sega Genesis
 World Series Baseball 2K2 for the Xbox
 Intellivision World Series Baseball, a baseball sports game (1983), designed by Don Daglow and Eddie Dombrower and published by Mattel for the Intellivision Entertainment Computer System

Aquatic sports
FINA Diving World Series
FINA Marathon Swim World Series
FINA Artistic Swimming World Series (for synchronised swimming)

Auto racing
 Champ Car World Series
 World Series by Renault, formerly called the World Series by Nissan

Card games
 World Series of Blackjack, a televised blackjack tournament created and produced by the cable network GSN
 World Series of Poker, a world-renowned series of poker tournaments held annually in Las Vegas and, since 2005, sponsored by Harrah's Entertainment

Cricket
 World Series Cricket, held from 1977–1979
 World Series Cup, held from 1979–1996

Indoor sports
 Heavyweight World Series, a series of professional boxing matches held in 1986 and 1987
 World Netball Series, an international netball competition that was contested for the first time in October 2009
 World Series of Darts (2006 tournament), a Professional Darts Corporation event in 2006
 World Series of Darts, a Professional Darts Corporation series starting in 2013
 World Series of Beer Pong, the largest Beer pong tournament in the world in number of participants and cash prizes offered
 World Series of Boxing (WSB) is an international boxing competition for amateur boxers
 World Series of Snooker, an international snooker tournament series

Other contests
 ATP World Series, original name for the ATP International Series in men's tennis
 World Club Series, annual rugby league test series between clubs from the Australasian National Rugby League and Super League
 World Rugby Sevens Series, a series of men's rugby tournaments
 World Rugby Women's Sevens Series, a series of women's rugby tournaments
 World Series of Football (1902–1903), a series of football games played indoors at New York's Madison Square Garden in 1902 and 1903
 World Series of Football (1950), the unified championship of the National Football League and All-America Football Conference
 NEC World Series of Golf, a former PGA Tour event
 World Series of Golf (unofficial event), an annual golf competition
 The World Series of Pop Culture, a VH1 game show tournament program sponsored by Alltel Wireless, based on Entertainment Weekly's Pop Culture Quiz
 World Series of Soccer, initially a series of senior international soccer matches held by USSF between 1991 and 1994
 World Series Wrestling

Miscellaneous
 World Series of Rock, a concert series
World Series of Country Music Proudly Presents Stock Car Racing's Entertainers of the Year, a 1985 concept album featuring 22 NASCAR drivers

See also 
 List of world sports championships
 World championship, the top achievement for any sport or contest
 World Cup (disambiguation)